I Scream is an EP by Some Velvet Sidewalk, released in 1993.

Track listing
"Ice Cream Overdrive"
"Shame"
"I Blame You"
"Ice Cream Overdrive (Frozen Solid Mix)"
"Shame (Misty Lavender Mix)"

Credits
Some Velvet Sidewalk
Al Larsen - voice & guitar
Martin Bernier - bass
Don Blair - drums

Additional personnel
"Ice Cream Overdrive" supervised by Calvin Johnson
"I Blame You" engineered by Stuart Hallerman
Remixes courtesy of Steve Fisk
Vocal clip on "Shame (Misty Lavender Mix)" by Stephen Jesse Bernstein

References

Some Velvet Sidewalk albums
1993 EPs
K Records EPs